Achimenes longiflora has many common names including Cupid's bow, nut-orchid, and magic flower.

The flowers are produced from June to October and are usually blue with a white throat.

This flor de peña (rock flower) was collected and documented in late summer blooming on  embankments and along roadsides at intermediate elevations in Guatemala in the 1970s by Carol Rogers Chickering.

References

Gesnerioideae
Plants described in 1839